Matthew Martin (born April 30, 1971) is an American former professional ice hockey defenseman. He played for the Toronto Maple Leafs of the National Hockey League. Martin was a member of Team USA during the 1994 Winter Olympics.

Career 
Martin played for Avon Old Farms from 1988 to 1990 and the University of Maine from 1990 to 1993. He was chosen 66th overall by the Toronto Maple Leafs in the 1989 NHL Entry Draft. Martin would go on to play a total of 76 games with the club, recording five assists and 71 penalty minutes. He retired in 2003.

Personal life 
Martin and his wife, Deanne, have two sons, Bennett and Cale.

Career statistics

Regular season and playoffs

International

External links 
 

1971 births
American men's ice hockey defensemen
Chicago Wolves (IHL) players
Ice hockey players from Connecticut
Idaho Steelheads (WCHL) players
Kalamazoo Wings (1974–2000) players
Living people
Maine Black Bears men's ice hockey players
People from Hamden, Connecticut
St. John's Maple Leafs players
Toronto Maple Leafs draft picks
Toronto Maple Leafs players
Ice hockey players at the 1994 Winter Olympics
Olympic ice hockey players of the United States
NCAA men's ice hockey national champions
Avon Old Farms alumni